Radoslav Radev (born 27 February 1960) is a Bulgarian diver. He competed in the men's 10 metre platform event at the 1980 Summer Olympics.

References

1960 births
Living people
Bulgarian male divers
Olympic divers of Bulgaria
Divers at the 1980 Summer Olympics
Place of birth missing (living people)